James Irving Fell (4 January 1936 – 2 February 2011) was an English footballer, who played in the Football League for Grimsby Town, Everton, Newcastle United, Walsall and Lincoln City.

Playing career

Grimsby Town
Fell attended Clee Grammar School for Boys, becoming a chemist at Courtaulds whilst playing part-time for Grimsby Town.

The 1958–59 season commenced with Fell taking on the role of emergency goalkeeper after regular custodian Clarrie Williams was injured in the season's opening game against Liverpool at Anfield in front of a crowd of 47,502 on 23 August 1958. With no substitutes allowed, Fell replaced Williams between the sticks and performed so heroically in the 3–3 draw that The Daily Mirror presented him with an 'Andy Capp' award.

Lincoln City
Fell joined Lincoln City in January 1964, debuting in the 2–1 victory at Hartlepools United on 11 January 1964 and scoring his first goal for the club in the 2–1 home defeat to Bradford City on 30 March 1964. He was a regular in the starting line-up in his first two seasons at Sincil Bank but played just three times at the start of the 1965/66 season before joining Boston United.

Retirement
A keen angler and cricketer, in his later years he worked at Grimsby Leisure Centre and died, of natural causes, at his home in Welholme Road, Grimsby on 2 February 2011.

References

External links
Lincoln City F.C. Official archive profile

1936 births
English Football League players
English footballers
Grimsby Town F.C. players
Everton F.C. players
Newcastle United F.C. players
Walsall F.C. players
Lincoln City F.C. players
Boston United F.C. players
2011 deaths
Association football midfielders